Bagongshan is a district of the city of Huainan, Anhui Province, China.

The district is famous for its beef soup, often eaten for breakfast, its tofu, and for being the located of Bagong Mountain Scenic Spot.

Administrative divisions
In the present, Bagongshan District has 3 subdistricts, 2 towns and 1 other.
3 Subdistricts
 Xinzhuangzi
 Tubazi
 Bijiagang

2 Towns
 Bagongshan
 Shanwang

1 Other
 Miaoshan Forestry

Natural resources 
There is a considerable amount of minerals in Bagongshan District, especially coal. Marble, limestone, kaolin, mineral water, etc. can be also found here.

See also
 Bagong Mountain Scenic Spot

References

Huainan
Bagongshan District